Kfar Vradim is a town (local council) in northern Israel, with a population of 5800 (2018). Kfar Vradim is close to Ma'alot-Tarshiha (2 kilometers), Karmiel (16 kilometers) and Nahariya (20 kilometers).

History

It was established by Stef Wertheimer to create an industrial town in rural surroundings. The first families were mostly workers of ISCAR Metalworking, owned by Wertheimer, which manufactures metal blades and high performance cutting tools. Kfar Vradim is located near  Ma'alot-Tarshiha and Yanuh-Jat, and is connected to the highway by Road 854. Road 8721 runs through the town, connecting it to Yanuh-Jat.

As of 2018, there were contentious plans to build 2,200 new housing units, more than doubling the number of households in the town.

Climate
Kfar Vradim is situated between 550–620 meters (1800–2050 feet) above sea level, providing for a relatively dry and Mediterranean climate.
Precipitation is mostly between October and March and is mainly made up of rain showers and scarce snowfall.

Education
Kfar Vradim has an elementary school (Keshet school) and a middle school (Amirim middle school) which is also a high school since 2013.

Notable residents
Shani Boianjiu, novelist.
Matti Caspi, musician.

Twin towns

Kfar Vradim is twinned with:
 Castrillo Mota de Judíos, Spain

References

External links

Kfar Vradim website 

Local councils in Northern District (Israel)
Populated places in Northern District (Israel)
Populated places established in 1984
1984 establishments in Israel